Henri-Bernard Dabadie (19 January 1797 – 20 May 1853) was a French baritone, particularly associated with Rossini and Auber roles.

Life and career
Born in Pau, Dabadie studied at the Paris Conservatory and made his debut at the Paris Opéra in 1819 as Cinna in Spontini's La Vestale.

He was to remain at the Opéra until 1836, creating roles specifically written for him by Rossini – notably the Pharaon in Moïse et Pharaon, Raimbaud in Le comte Ory, and Guillaume Tell. He also created roles in opera by Auber – Pietro in La muette de Portici, Jolicoeur in Le Philtre, and Jean in Le Serment.

He also sang in Italy, where he created Belcore in Donizetti's L'elisir d'amore, in Milan on 12 May 1832.

On 6 November 1821, Dabadie married soprano Zulmée Leroux (1795–1877), who began using her married name Dabadie, when she sang at the Paris Opera, where she created the role of Sinaide in Moise and Jemmy in Guillaume Tell.

References

Bibliography
 Mancini, Roland and Jean-Jacques Rouveroux (orig. H. Rosenthal and J. Warrack, French edition) (eds): Guide de l'opéra (Paris: Fayard, 1995); 
 Tamvaco, Jean-Louis (2000). "Dabadie / Leroux [les]", pp. 919–921, in Les Cancans de l'Opéra: Chroniques de l'Académie Royale de Musique et du théâtre, à Paris sous les deux Restaurations. CNRS. 1307 pages. . .
 Warrack, John; West, Ewan (1992). The Oxford Dictionary of Opera. Oxford: Oxford University Press. .

1797 births
1853 deaths
19th-century French male opera singers
Conservatoire de Paris alumni
French operatic baritones
People from Pau, Pyrénées-Atlantiques